Koulis Pantziaras (born April 24, 1958) is a retired Cypriot football defender.

References

1958 births
Living people
Cypriot footballers
APOEL FC players
Cyprus international footballers
Association football defenders